Brian Warner (born 25 May 1939)  is a British South African optical astronomer who is Emeritus Distinguished Professor of natural philosophy at the University of Cape Town. Warner's research has included cataclysmic variable stars, pulsars, degenerate stars and binary stars. He has also researched and published on the history of astronomy in South Africa.

Biography

Early life and education 
Warner was born 25 May 1939 in Crawley Down, Sussex, England. His father was a gardener on a country estate and his mother was a charwoman. He didn't pass his eleven-plus exam, failing in mathematics, but was nonetheless admitted to the East Grinstead County Grammar School on the recommendation of his teacher. As a schoolboy he befriended the noted amateur astronomer Patrick Moore who lived nearby in East Grinstead where Warner and his friends would use Moore's telescope.

Warner went to University College London (UCL) in 1958 to study undergraduate astronomy. As a student, he was able to use the  University of London Observatory. His first two papers were published in 1960, shortly before he graduated. The first in the Journal of the British Astronomical Association on rilles near the lunar crater Pluto, the second in Monthly Notices of the Royal Astronomical Society on the emission spectra of Venus. Warner remained at UCL for postgraduate studies, completing a PhD in astronomical spectroscopy in 1964 titled Abundances in Late type Stars. His doctoral supervisor was Roy Henry Garstang. For his thesis research he travelled to the Radcliffe Observatory in Pretoria, South Africa, to use the observatory's  telescope.

Career 
Warner became a postdoctoral researcher at UCL, before being awarded a Radcliffe-Henry Skynner Fellowship at Balliol College, Oxford, though the university didn't have its own observatory. In 1967 he was recruited to the University of Texas at Austin for his experience in spectroscopy. He also worked with his colleagues Ed Nather and David Evans in developing the new field of high-speed photometry for studying variable stars and measuring stellar radii by observing lunar occultations. In 1972 he was recruited as the first professor of astronomy at the University of Cape Town (UCT) and as head of the astronomy department. Nather also moved to UCT to undertake a PhD, with Warner as his doctoral supervisor. From 1981 to 1983, he served as president of the Royal Society of South Africa. Warner was head of the astronomy department until 1999, before formally retiring in 2004 though he continues to undertake research.

Awards and honours 

 McIntyre Award (1983) of the Astronomical Society of Southern Africa
 The John F.W. Herschel Medal (1988) of the Royal Society of South Africa
 South Africa Medal (1989) of the Southern African Association for the Advancement of Science
 Gill Medal (1992) of the Astronomical Society of Southern Africa
 Honorary fellow of the Royal Astronomical Society (1994)
 Honorary member of the Royal Astronomical Society of New Zealand (1995)
 Science-for-Society Gold Medal (2004) of the Academy of Science of South Africa
 Honorary fellow of the Royal Society of South Africa (2008)
 Honorary doctorate from the University of Cape Town (2009)
 Honorary fellow of University College London (2009)
 Fellow of The World Academy of Sciences (2009)

Books

Authored

Edited

References 

1939 births
People from Essex
British astronomers
South African astronomers
Alumni of University College London
Academics of University College London
Academics of the University of Oxford
University of Texas at Arlington faculty
Academic staff of the University of Cape Town
Fellows of the Royal Astronomical Society
Fellows of the Royal Society of South Africa
Historians of astronomy
Living people